Sir Kobina Arku Korsah  (3 April 1894 – 25 January 1967) was the first Chief Justice of Ghana (then the Gold Coast) in 1956.

Biography

Born in Saltpond, Korsah was educated at Mfantsipim School, Fourah Bay College (BA degree in 1915), Durham University and London University (LLB in 1919).

Korsah won the Cape Coast seat in the 1927 Gold Coast general election. He was one of nine Africans to be represented in the Legislative Assembly at the time. He was re-elected for the same seat in 1931 and 1935 general elections.

In 1942, Nana Sir Ofori Atta and Sir Arku Korsah were the first two Ghanaians to be appointed to the Executive Council of the  Legislative Council by the then Governor of the Gold Coast, Sir Alan Burns.  
 
Korsah was one of the 20 founding members of the Ghana Academy of Arts and Sciences in 1959.  
 
After the Kulungugu attack on President Kwame Nkrumah in August 1962, Sir Arku Korsah presided over the trial of five defendants. At the end of that trial, three of the accused were found not guilty and this displeased the Nkrumah government. Nkrumah sacked Sir Arku as Chief Justice in December 1963 unconstitutionally.

Family

One of his sons, Roger who was a high court judge in Ghana, moved to Zimbabwe where he became a judge on the Supreme Court of Zimbabwe. He died in February 2017.

See also

 Chief Justice of Ghana
 List of judges of the Supreme Court of Ghana
 Supreme Court of Ghana

References

See also

Supreme Court of Ghana
List of judges of the Supreme Court of Ghana

  
 – 
 

1894 births
1967 deaths
Alumni of the University of London
Fourah Bay College alumni
Ghanaian Freemasons
20th-century Ghanaian judges
Ghanaian MPs 1951–1954
Chief justices of Ghana
Mfantsipim School alumni
People from Central Region (Ghana)
Justices of the Supreme Court of Ghana
Fellows of the Ghana Academy of Arts and Sciences
Ghanaian Methodists
Alumni of Durham University